Bildøyna or Bildøy is an island in Øygarden Municipality in Vestland county, Norway.  The  island lies between the islands of Litlesotra (to its west) and Store Sotra (to its east). An upper secondary school and a lower secondary school are located on the island.

See also
List of islands of Norway

References

Islands of Vestland
Øygarden